Diego Armando Barbosa Zaragoza (born 25 September 1996) is a Mexican professional footballer who plays as a right-back for Liga MX club Atlas.

Career statistics

Club

Honours
Atlas
Liga MX: Apertura 2021, Clausura 2022
Campeón de Campeones: 2022

Individual
Liga MX Best XI: Apertura 2021

References

1996 births
Living people
Mexican footballers
Liga MX players
Venados F.C. players
Atlas F.C. footballers
Dorados de Sinaloa footballers
Association football defenders